John Gillespie may refer to:

 John H. Gillespie, evolutionary biologist
John Gillespie (auditor) (1832–1897) state auditor and commissioner in Nebraska  
 Dizzy Gillespie (John Birks Gillespie, 1917–1993), jazz trumpeter
 Jimmy Gillespie (John Imrie Gillespie, 1879–1943), Scottish rugby union player
 John Ross Gillespie (born 1935), field hockey player and coach from New Zealand
 John Gillespie (baseball) (1900–1954),  Major League Baseball pitcher
 John Gillespie (footballer, born 1870) (1870–1933), Scottish footballer for Queen's Park FC and Scotland
 John Gillespie (footballer, born 1873) (1873–?), Scottish footballer for Sunderland
 John Gillespie (moderator) (1834–1912), Moderator of the General Assembly of the Church of Scotland in 1903/04
 John Hamilton Gillespie (1852–1923), Scottish-American soldier, land developer, businessman and politician
 John Gillespie (legislator), member of the Wisconsin State Assembly
 John Gillespie (producer) of Hollywood North
 John Gillespie (Tennessee) Member of the Tennessee House of Representatives

See also
 John Gillespie Magee Jr. (1922–1941), Anglo-American aviator and poet